The National Trade Union Confederation (Cartel ALFA) is a national trade union center in Romania. It was founded June, 1990 and has a membership of 325,000.

Cartel ALFA is affiliated with the International Trade Union Confederation, and the European Trade Union Confederation.

References

External links
 Cartel ALFA official site.

International Trade Union Confederation
European Trade Union Confederation
Trade unions established in 1990
National trade union centers of Romania